The Orange County Zoo is a small  zoo located within the  Irvine Regional Park in the city of Orange, California, United States. The zoo is mainly home to animals and plants that are native to the Southwestern United States.

History

The current zoo is owned, staffed and operated by the County of Orange, and officially opened as the Irvine Park Zoo in 1985.

However, there have been animals in captivity on the site since 1905, when red foxes were introduced and bred by J.A. Turner. In 1920, a small collection of animals featuring a pair of mule deer was started by Tustin rancher Sam Nau. Eventually Nau built a pen for the deer. The main attraction was an alligator exhibit until a bird exhibit including cockatoos, quail, doves, and parakeets was added in 1935.

Animals

Animals at the zoo are primarily from the Southwestern United States, and include, black bears, cougars, bald eagles, red-tailed hawks, barn owls, great horned owls, porcupines, coyotes, mule deer, turkey vultures, coati, and bobcats. The zoos residents come to them injured, orphaned, abandoned, or as confiscated pets, and these animals help teach visitors about the animals they may encounter in the hill, canyons, and backyards of the area.

The zoo includes a barnyard with domestic animals such as goats, jacob sheep, doves, and pheasants. Visitors can purchase grain to feed the animals here, and can even touch some of them.

Other facilities

The zoo offers cell phone audio tours. Visitors can hear information about the animals in the exhibit from the animal keepers, veterinarian, education coordinator, and curator, including their names, diet, where they came from, and why they are at the zoo.

Notes

External links

Irvine Park Railroad

Zoos in California
Orange, California
Tourist attractions in Orange County, California
Zoos established in 1985
1985 establishments in California